One Morning! Café was a Philippine morning radio and television show that was aired simultaneously on three government-owned-and-controlled television stations NBN (now; PTV), RPN and IBC and in radio via 13 RPN Radyo Ronda and 32 PBS Radyo ng Bayan stations of the Philippine Broadcasting Service.

The show premiered on April 9, 2007, at 6:00am as One Morning with Veronica Baluyut-Jimenez, Jasmine Romero of NBN (now; PTV), Aljo Bendijo, Aryana Lim and Bobby Yan of RPN, and Zorayda Ruth Andam of IBC along with new hosts Claudine Trillo, Marion Chua and Jennifer Illustre. In 2008, the program remained its airing on RPN although the network expanded its partnership with Solar Entertainment by bringing C/S on RPN and Solar TV in 2009 along with other original productions of the network. In 2009, the program underwent title and format change, thus the program was renamed as One Morning Café.

The program aired its final episode on June 29, 2010, a day before the Inauguration of Benigno Aquino III as President of the Philippines.

Hosts

Final hosts
 Veronica Baluyut-Jimenez (NBN)
 Aljo Bendijo (RPN)
 Cutie Del Mar
 Oliver Abelleda (Radyo ng Bayan)

Former hosts
 Aryana Lim (RPN)
 Marion Chua
 Claudine Trillo
 Jennifer Illustre
 Charlene Lontoc
 Bobby Yan (RPN)
 JM Rodriguez
 Jasmin Romero (NBN)
 Zorayda Ruth Andam (IBC)

See also
 List of programs aired by People's Television Network
 List of programs previously broadcast by Radio Philippines Network
 List of programs previously broadcast by Intercontinental Broadcasting Corporation

Philippine television news shows
Radio Philippines Network original programming
People's Television Network
People's Television Network original programming
RPN News and Public Affairs shows
Radio Philippines Network news shows
Intercontinental Broadcasting Corporation original programming
IBC News and Public Affairs shows
Intercontinental Broadcasting Corporation news shows
Filipino-language television shows
2007 Philippine television series debuts
2010 Philippine television series endings
Simulcasts